David Ferrer was the defending champion, but withdrew from his second round match due to a hamstring injury.
Andy Murray won in the final 6–3, 6–2, against Mikhail Youzhny.

Seeds

Draw

Finals

Top half

Bottom half

Qualifying

Seeds

Qualifiers

Draw

First qualifier

Second qualifier

Third qualifier

Fourth qualifier

External links
 Main draw
 Qualifying draw

Singles